Afshin Parsaeian Rad (born February 1, 1980) is an Iranian footballer who previously plays for Persitara North Jakarta in the Indonesia Super League.

References

External links

1980 births
Association football defenders
Iranian expatriate footballers
Iranian expatriate sportspeople in Indonesia
Iranian footballers
Expatriate footballers in Indonesia
Liga 1 (Indonesia) players
Living people
Persitara Jakarta Utara players